The , commonly called , is a Japanese,  narrow gauge industrial railway line in Tateyama, Toyama. It is operated by the Tateyama Mountain Area Sabō Office, which belongs to the Hokuriku Regional Development Bureau of the Ministry of Land, Infrastructure and Transport.

Overview
The line transports materials and workers for the construction/conservation of erosion control facilities of Jōganji River, such as dams. Unlike ordinary railways in Japan, the line is not regulated by the Railway Business Law nor the Tram Law, but by the Industrial Safety and Health Law. It means the line is not a public transportation, but solely a construction facility. However, the line is well known among railfans. This is one of few Japanese railways, or possibly the only surviving one, to use  narrow gauge track. Also, it is one of the lines with the largest number of railway zig zags in the world. Because of its historical significance, the line is registered as a Monument of Japan.

History

Basic data
Distance: 

Rails: 15 kg/m
Maximum speed: 18 km/h (uphill), 15 km/h (downhill)
Vertical interval: 
Liaison offices: 6
Double-track line: None
Electric supply: Not electrified
Average gradient: 3.5 %
Maximum gradient: 5.0 %
Tunnels: 12
Bridges: 20
Railway zig zags: 38, concentrated in 8 places
Until 2005, there were 42 railway zig zags concentrated in 9 places.

Liaison offices

: Near Tateyama Station of Toyama Chihō Railway Tateyama Line and Tateyama Cable Car. Altitude .

: Altitude .

Rolling stock

Diesel locomotives: 9
Work trains: 4
Passenger cars: 16
Freight cars: 104

Services

See also
Kurobe Senyō Railway
Tateyama Cable Car
Industrial railway

References

External links

Tateyama Mountain Area Sabō Office official website
 Tateyama Mountain Area Sabō Office official website
 Tateyama Caldera Sabō Museum official website, a museum which hosts the study tour.

Railway lines in Japan
Rail transport in Toyama Prefecture
2 ft gauge railways in Japan
Railway lines opened in 1929
Registered Monuments of Japan
Tateyama, Toyama
Railways with Zig Zags